Sybra biguttula is a species of beetle in the family Cerambycidae. It was described by Breuning in 1964. It contains two subspecies, Sybra biguttula biguttula and Sybra biguttula samarensis.

References

biguttula
Beetles described in 1964